Sakurabashi Station (桜橋駅) is the name of train stations in Japan:

Sakurabashi Station (Shizuoka)
 Sakurabashi Station (Toyama)
 Kitashinchi Station in Osaka, which was planned and constructed under the provisional name Sakurabashi Station